The Battle of Shrewsbury was a battle fought on 21 July 1403, waged between an army led by the Lancastrian King Henry IV and a rebel army led by Henry "Harry Hotspur" Percy from Northumberland. The battle, the first in which English archers fought each other on English soil, reaffirmed the effectiveness of the longbow and ended the Percy challenge to King Henry IV of England.

Part of the fighting is believed to have taken place at what is now Battlefield, Shropshire, England, three miles (5 km) north of the centre of Shrewsbury. It is marked today by Battlefield Church and Battlefield Heritage Park.

Background
The Percys had previously supported Henry IV in a war against King Richard II of England, which ended when Henry IV took the throne in 1399. The Percys subsequently supported Henry IV in Wales, early in the rebellion of Owain Glyndŵr, and in Scotland, in both negotiations and conflict against the Scots.

King Henry IV had been supported by a number of wealthy landowners to whom he had promised land, money and royal favour in return for their continued support. When the war ended, lands in and around Cumberland promised to the Percys were instead given to a rival. The promised money never materialised, and so the Percys revolted. Henry Percy, 1st Earl of Northumberland, and Thomas Percy, 1st Earl of Worcester, publicly renounced their allegiance to King Henry IV. They charged him with perjury because he claimed the throne in addition to his old lands and titles, taxed the clergy despite his promise not to without the consent of Parliament, imprisoned and murdered King Richard II, did not allow a free Parliamentary election, and refused to pay a just ransom to Owain Glyndŵr, who was then holding Edmund Mortimer. The King also retained custody of the Scottish nobles captured at Homildon Hill as prisoners of war rather than permitting the Percys to release them for ransom.

Henry Percy, nicknamed "Hotspur," raised a group initially of about 200 retainers in early July 1403, and started the long march south to meet his uncle, Thomas Percy. Some nobles joined him, such as Lord Bardolf, but he recruited most of his army in Cheshire, an area hostile to Henry IV, which provided many experienced soldiers, notably its Cheshire archers, some of whom had served as Richard II's bodyguard. Henry Percy may have hoped for reinforcements from Wales under the Prince of Wales, Owain Glyndŵr, but he was disappointed. Glyndŵr, at the time fighting in Carmarthenshire, was unaware that Hotspur had acted. Some Welsh forces from the Cheshire borders may have joined him. The rebels then marched towards Shrewsbury, the heavily defended county town in Shropshire.

King Henry IV only became aware of the Percy forces on 12 July, apparently while he was marching an army north to assist the Percys against the Scots, receiving the news at Burton-on-Trent. He may have anticipated the Percys' change of heart, but instantly altered his plans to meet the immediate threat posed by the Percys. He changed direction and marched west towards Shrewsbury with his army, arriving  before the Percys could capture the town.

Both forces arrived in the Shrewsbury area on 20 July and set up camp to the north and south of the Severn River, which loops around the town. Hotspur based himself initially at the house of William Betton, his army camping close to the town. The next day the King's forces crossed the River Severn at Uffington, about a mile to the east of Shrewsbury to cut off Percy's line of retreat to Chester. They failed and the armies took up position in a field that was variously named: "Haytleyfield", "Husefeld", "Berwykfeld", "Bolefeld". The battle commenced in the manor of Harlescott about a mile south west of where Battlefield Church now stands. (The owner of this manor, Richard Hussey, swore to this fact under oath in the escheator's court in January 1416). The battle took place in a large field of peas.

Estimates of the sizes of the two armies vary widely, and the medieval chronicles are subject to exaggeration. Annales Henrici Quarti states 14,000 Royal troops, far fewer than Waurin's estimate of 60,000. Although Henry's army is generally agreed to have been larger, John Capgrave writing in the Chronicle of England quotes Percy's army as 14,000.

For much of the morning of Saturday 21 July, the two forces parleyed. Thomas Prestbury, the Abbot of Shrewsbury and the Abbot of Haughmond presented the King's terms. Hotspur declined any terms and Thomas Percy spoke to the King, trading insults. Henry Percy was somewhat inclined toward accepting the King's position, while his uncle Thomas Percy was not. Negotiations ended near noon, and the two forces advanced closer for the fight.  One rebel, later pardoned, went over to the royal army and the king knighted several of his followers.

Battle

About two hours before dusk, King Henry IV raised his sword. The battle opened with a massive archery barrage, arrows killing or wounding many men before they could meet hand to hand in the field. Percy's Cheshire bowmen proved generally superior. Thomas Walsingham recorded how the King's men "fell like leaves in Autumn, every one [arrow] struck a mortal man". According to the Dieulacres Chronicle the King's right wing under the command of the Earl of Stafford (who was killed) fled from the field. Far more than this wing may have fled as well, as there is evidence that some baggage was looted and after the battle the Cheshire rebels were "prosecuted" for taking some 7,000 horses with them. Prince Henry, Prince of Wales was hit in the face with an arrow during the fighting, sustaining a terrible wound. He later recovered due to the skilled treatment of the Physician General John Bradmore, who used honey, alcohol and a specially designed surgical instrument to extract the arrowhead. He was left with a permanent scar. Bradmore recorded treating Prince Henry in his Latin manuscript, Philomena. An account of this can also be found in Thomas Morstede's 1446 surgical treaty.

Enough of the King's men remained on the field, particularly on the left wing, which was under the command of the Prince of Wales. Perhaps in desperation, Hotspur led a charge aimed at killing the King himself, during which the Royal Standard was overthrown and its bearer, Sir Walter Blount, was hacked down by Archibald Douglas, 4th Earl of Douglas. Hotspur was killed in the charge, reputedly shot in the face with an arrow when he opened his visor. His death was initially not realised, and some point soon afterwards the Northumbrian knights hailed the death of Henry IV, exclaiming "Henry Percy King!". Henry IV was not dead however, and retaliated by shouting "Henry Percy is dead"; the absence of a reply confirmed that Henry Percy was indeed dead. The battle ended soon after. It is recorded that many did not know who had won. The King's forces sustained greater losses than the rebels, and Henry IV very nearly lost both his life and his throne.

Aftermath
Henry Percy was initially buried by his maternal first cousin, Thomas Nevill, 5th Baron Furnivall at Whitchurch, Shropshire, with honours, but rumours soon spread that he was not really dead. In response the King had him disinterred. His body was salted, set up in Shrewsbury impaled on a spear between two millstones in the marketplace pillory, with an armed guard, and was later quartered and put on display in Chester, London, Bristol and Newcastle upon Tyne. His head was sent to York and impaled on the north gate, looking toward his own lands. In November his grisly remains were returned to his widow Elizabeth.

The Earl of Worcester was beheaded and Sir Richard Venables, Sir Richard Vernon and Sir Henry Boynton were publicly hanged, drawn and quartered in Shrewsbury on 23 July and their heads publicly displayed, Thomas Percy's on London Bridge.

Battlefield Church is said to have been erected over the site of the mass burial pit dug immediately after the battle. It was built initially as a memorial chapel, on the orders of King Henry IV and paid for by him, with prayers and masses being said continually for the dead on both sides. The chapel was replaced in 1460 by a church, which was further restored in 1862. A drain being dug in a corner of the churchyard may have inadvertently opened part of the burial pit. Workmen were surprised by the mass of bones which they thought showed the hurried nature of the burials. They may have merely unearthed a charnel pit containing bones of a variety of different ages.

In 2006, the BBC show Two Men in a Trench proved only that an area to the west of the church was not in fact a graveyard.

There were two other 15th century churches associated with battles. The one at Towton no longer exists but remains of it have been identified as lying beneath the present day Towton Hall by the archaeologist Tim Sutherland. The other for the battle of Wakefield still stands on Wakefield Bridge. Neither was near the battlefield.

Cultural references
The battle itself and many of the key people involved appear in Shakespeare's Henry IV, Part 1, with the fictional participation of Sir John Falstaff and Hotspur being killed by Prince Henry. It is also depicted in the 1966 movie Chimes at Midnight (released in the UK as Falstaff), in the 2012 BBC Two adaptation of Shakespeare's play, and in the climax to a historical novel by Edith Pargeter, A Bloody Field by Shrewsbury (1972) (US title: The Bloody Field). 

The battle features in an early and highly inaccurate sequence in the 2019 David Michod film The King, in which the battle does not take place because Prince Henry, wresting command of the royal forces from his brother Thomas, and Hotspur fight in single combat rather than having the battle fought. After a lengthy scene in which the duel begins with swords and ends up a wrestling match, Prince Henry kills Hotspur by stabbing him in the neck and the day is won. The motivations for the rebellion - the king's refusal to ransom Edmund Mortimer and the discontent of the Percys with Henry IV's regime - are left intentionally vague. Prince Henry, later ascending the throne as Henry V, begins his reign with a policy of conciliation, with one of his first stated acts being the ransoming of Mortimer.

Notes

References
 Barker, Juliet; Agincourt: The King, the Campaign, the Battle, UK: Little, Brown, 2005; 
 Morgan, Philip J.; The Battle of Shrewsbury 1403 
 Prestwich, Michael; Armies and Warfare in the Middle Ages: the English Experience Yale University Press, 1996; 
 Priestley, E.J.; The Battle of Shrewsbury 1403. Shrewsbury and Atcham Borough Council 1979 (booklet)
 Maxfield, Stephen; The Battlefield of Shrewsbury 
 Whitewood, Dickon; Shrewsbury 1403: Struggle for a Fragile Crown, UK: Osprey, 2017;  

Online:
 Alastair Dunn, A kingdom in crisis: Henry IV and the battle of Shrewsbury: Alastair Dunn discusses the battle and its repercussions in its 600th anniversary year, History Today, August 2003

1403 in Europe
1403 in England
Battles involving England
Military history of Shropshire
Battle
Registered historic battlefields in England
Battles of the Middle Ages
Conflicts in 1403
Henry IV of England
Glyndŵr Rising